Richmond Lockwood Sexson (born December 29, 1974), nicknamed "Big Sexy",  is an American former Major League Baseball first baseman who played for five teams from 1997 to 2008. He is also the field manager for the Windy City ThunderBolts in the West division of the Frontier League.

Amateur career
Sexson was born in Portland, Oregon. At Prairie High School in Brush Prairie, Washington, Sexson was an All-State performer in baseball, basketball, and football. He also set the school record for the most RBI and home runs in a career.

He was offered a scholarship to play both college baseball and college basketball for the Portland Pilots.

Professional career

Cleveland Indians
Sexson was drafted in 1993 by the Cleveland Indians in the 24th round (671st overall) of the baseball amateur draft. He reached the major leagues with five games in 1997. Sexson had a breakout year in 1999 with 31 home runs, and 116 runs batted in in 134 games.

Milwaukee Brewers
In 2000, Sexson was traded to the Milwaukee Brewers with a player to be named later, for Bob Wickman, Steve Woodard, and Jason Bere. In 2001, his 45 home runs tied the Brewers record set by Gorman Thomas in 1979.  His 178 strikeouts also broke the Brewers record, but this was surpassed the following season by José Hernández. On September 25, 2001, Sexson and teammate Jeromy Burnitz each hit three home runs in a 9-4 win against the Arizona Diamondbacks. It was the first and, as of the 2021 season, only time that two players hit three home runs in the same game, let alone two teammates. In 2002, Sexson represented the Brewers in the MLB All-Star Game which was played in Milwaukee. In 2003, he played in all 162 games and again tied the Brewers record of 45 home runs while hitting .272 and earning a selection to the 2003 MLB All-Star Game.  Prince Fielder broke Sexson's and Thomas's team record in 2007, hitting 50 home runs.

Sexson was the first of three players in Brewers history to have 100 or more RBIs in three consecutive seasons along with Fielder in 2007–2009 and Ryan Braun in 2008–10.

Arizona Diamondbacks
Sexson was traded to the Arizona Diamondbacks in December 2003 along with pitcher Shane Nance and a player to be named later (Noochie Varner) for infielders Junior Spivey, Craig Counsell, Lyle Overbay, catcher Chad Moeller, and pitchers Chris Capuano and Jorge de la Rosa. This trade proved to be disastrous for the Diamondbacks, as Sexson missed most of the 2004 season after twice suffering a reverse subluxation of his left shoulder while attempting to check his swing.

Seattle Mariners

Prior to the 2005 season, Sexson signed a four-year contract with the Seattle Mariners worth $50 million. Sexson played well in the 2005 season, hitting 39 home runs and 121 RBI and put up similar numbers the following year, hitting 34 home runs and 107 RBI. However, Sexson struggled mightily in the 2007 season, batting .205 with 21 home runs and 63 RBIs, and again in the 2008 season, hitting just .218 with 11 home runs and 30 RBIs for Seattle.

On May 8, 2008, in a game against the Texas Rangers, Sexson charged the mound towards Rangers starting pitcher Kason Gabbard and threw his batting helmet at him after Gabbard threw a head-high pitch over the middle of the plate, to which Sexson reacted as if it had hit him. Sexson later stated he was frustrated and had a lot going on in his head, including his son being in the hospital and his club's recent struggles. He was suspended six games for the incident. He later appealed the suspension, and it was dropped to five games.

On July 10, 2008, Sexson was released by the Mariners.

New York Yankees
On July 18, 2008, Sexson signed with the New York Yankees. Sexson did well in his Yankee debut, by collecting his first hit as a Yankee in the first inning with a single and also bringing in Bobby Abreu for the first run that inning. He went 1–3 with one RBI, one walk, and one strikeout. His only home run (a grand slam) as a New York Yankee came on August 5, 2008, against the Texas Rangers. Sexson was designated for assignment on August 15, 2008, after batting .250 with one home run in 22 games for New York. He was released on August 24, 2008.

Windy City ThunderBolts 
On October 20, 2022 Sexson was announced as the new field manager of the Windy City ThunderBolts. This is the first professional managerial position for Sexson after coaching at Summit High School in Bend, Oregon. Sexson's first coaching staff hire was Chris Coleman as the third base coach and infield coordinator.

Personal life
In May 2005, Sexson pleaded guilty in Clark County, Washington to second degree negligent driving after initially being charged with drunk driving. He was ordered to pay a $538 fine.

Sexson recently lived in Ridgefield, Washington with his wife Kerry. Since 2014, he has been a baseball coach at Summit High School in Bend, Oregon.

See also

 List of Major League Baseball career home run leaders

References

External links

1974 births
Living people
Baseball players from Portland, Oregon
People from Ridgefield, Washington
Major League Baseball first basemen
Major League Baseball left fielders
National League All-Stars
Cleveland Indians players
Milwaukee Brewers players
Arizona Diamondbacks players
Seattle Mariners players
New York Yankees players
Burlington Indians players (1986–2006)
Buffalo Bisons (minor league) players
Canton-Akron Indians players
Kinston Indians players